Prelate is a village in the Canadian province of Saskatchewan within the Rural Municipality of Happyland No. 231 and Census Division No. 8. Located just of Highway 32 it is 12 km (8 miles) east of Leader and 146 km (90 miles) northwest of Swift Current.

History 
Prelate was first settled in 1908. Prelate incorporated as a village on October 25, 1913.

Historical sites
St. Angela's Convent and St. Angela's Academy of Prelate was founded in 1919. The boarding school for girls was run by the Ursuline Sisters until it closed in 2007.
Saints Peter and Paul Church (Blumenfeld Church) located 15 km south of Prelate is a Municipal Heritage Property. Built in 1915, the church served the Catholics of German descent of the Prelate area. The grounds feature a fieldstone shrine and wrought iron crosses mark some of the graves in the cemetery.

Demographics 

Education
The Islamic Academy of Saskatchewan, an Islamic boarding school for boys, opened in 2011 in the former St. Angela's Convent and Academy building. Enrolment is expected to be about 100 students and will offer Grades 4 to 12.

Notable people
Ross Alger, politician
Roxanne Goldade, country singer
Mark Pederson, ice hockey left winger
David Herle, Liberal political advisor

See also 
 List of communities in Saskatchewan
 Villages of Saskatchewan

References

Villages in Saskatchewan
Happyland No. 231, Saskatchewan
Division No. 8, Saskatchewan